Alex C. Delos Santos born on September 24, 1967, in San Jose, Antique is a Karay-a writer.

References

1967 births
Karay-a people
People from Antique (province)
20th-century Filipino poets
University of the Philippines Visayas alumni
21st-century Filipino poets
20th-century male writers
21st-century male writers
Filipino male poets
Living people